Silver Eensaar (born 29 July 1978, in Tartu) is an Estonian orienteer, rogainer and adventure racer. At the 10th World Rogaining Championships in Přebuz, Czech Republic in 2012 he won a gold medal and the title of the World Rogaining Champion in team with his brother Rain Eensaar in Men's teams category. At 11th World Rogaining Championships in Alol, Pskov oblast Russia in 2013 they successfully defended the title of the World Rogaining Champion. At 12th World Rogaining Championships in Black Hills, South Dakota in 2014 they won the third consecutive title of World Rogaining Champions. 

In 2011 he and his brother Rain won a gold medal and the title of the European Rogaining Champion in Rauna, Latvia. 

At the European Adventure Race Championships he won a bronze medal in 2013 in Poland and a silver medal in 2014 in Turkey. 

He has won two gold medals at Estonian orienteering championships.

References

External links
 
 Silver Eensaar at World of O Runners

1978 births
Living people
Estonian orienteers
Male orienteers
Adventure racing
Sportspeople from Tartu